Vliets is an unincorporated community in Marshall County, Kansas, United States.  It is located at the southern terminus of Kansas Highway 87.

History
Vliets was laid out in 1889. It was named for the Van Vliet family, the original owner of the town site. A post office was opened in Vliets in 1897, and remained in operation until it was discontinued in 1992.

The community currently consists of a Co-op, a granary, and perhaps a dozen houses.

References

Further reading

External links
 Marshall County maps: Current, Historic, KDOT

Unincorporated communities in Marshall County, Kansas
Unincorporated communities in Kansas